Bernard Barrera (born 4 February 1962, in Marseille) is a general in the French Army. As commander of the 3rd Mechanized Brigade, he was in charge of ground operations during Operation Serval in Mali in 2013.

Decorations
French
 Commander de la Légion d'honneur
 Grand Officer de l'ordre national du Mérite
 Croix de la Valeur militaire (4 citations)
 Croix du combattant
 Médaille d'Outre-Mer
 Médaille de la Défense nationale
 Médaille de reconnaissance de la Nation
 Médaille commémorative française

Foreign decorations
 Médaille de l'OTAN
 National Order of Mali

References

External links 

French generals
1962 births
Military personnel from Marseille
Living people
Recipients of the National Order of Mali
Commandeurs of the Légion d'honneur
Grand Officers of the Ordre national du Mérite